Merlin Joseph Guilfoyle (July 15, 1908 – November 20, 1981) was an American prelate of the Catholic Church. He served as bishop of the Diocese of Stockton from 1969 to 1979.  He previously served as an auxiliary bishop of the Archdiocese of San Francisco from 1950 to 1969.

Biography

Early life 
Merlin Guilfoyle was born on July 15, 1908, in San Francisco, California, to John Joseph and Teresa (née Bassity) Guilfoyle. His parents' home was destroyed in the 1906 San Francisco earthquake. Prior to Guilfoyle's birth, they returned to San Francisco from two years living in Oakland, California. 

Guilfoyle attended St. James Boys' School in San Francisco from 1914 to 1922, and St. Joseph's College in Mountain View from 1922 to 1927. He then studied (1927-1933) at St. Patrick's Seminary in Menlo Park.

Priesthood 
Guilfoyle  was ordained to the priesthood on June 10, 1933. In 1937, he earned a Doctor of Canon Law degree from the Catholic University of America in Washington, D.C. He became a domestic prelate in 1949, and was co-founder and chaplain of the St. Thomas More Society.

Auxiliary Bishop of San Francisco 
On August 24, 1950, Guilfoyle was appointed auxiliary bishop of the Archdiocese of San Francisco and titular bishop of Bulla by Pope Pius XII. He received his episcopal consecration on September 21, 1950, from Archbishop John Mitty, with Bishops James Sweeney and Hugh Donohoe serving as co-consecrators.

In addition to his duties as bishop, Guilfoyle served as rector of Mission San Francisco de Asís (1950-1969) and military vicar of armed forces for the Archdiocese of San Francisco and the Dioceses of Monterey-Fresno, Sacramento, Reno, and Salt Lake City. On October 3, 1955, Guilfoyle dedicated a statue of Francis of Assisi by artist Beniamino Bufano at St. Francis of Assisi Church in San Francisco.

Bishop of Stockton 
Guilfoyle was named the second bishop of the Diocese of Stockton by Pope Paul VI on November 12, 1969. He was installed on January 13, 1970.

Retirement and legacy 
On September 4, 1979. Pope Paul II accepted Guilfoyle's resignation as bishop of the Diocese of Stockton.  Merlin Guilfoyle died in Stockton, California, on November 20, 1981, at age 73.

On July 17, 1998, a jury awarded two brothers $40 million in a sexual abuse lawsuit against the Diocese of Stockton.  Joh and James Howard said they were molested as altar boys by Reverend Oliver Francis O’Grady, a priest at St. Ann's Parish in Lodi, California, starting in the 1970's.  O'Grady had received 14 years in prison for molesting the boys.  In 1976, O'Grady had admitted to Guilfoyle directly that he had inappropriately touched Nancy Sloan-Ferguson, then an 11 year old girl.  In response, Guilfoyle transferred him to another parish and sent him to counseling - he did not suspend his privileges or notify police.  The lawsuit accused the diocese of negligence.

See also

References

1908 births
1981 deaths
People from San Francisco
Roman Catholic Archdiocese of San Francisco
Roman Catholic bishops of Stockton
Saint Patrick's Seminary and University alumni
20th-century Roman Catholic bishops in the United States
Catholic University of America alumni